Carel Balth (Rotterdam, November 25, 1939 – Vreeland, July 10, 2019) was a Dutch artist and curator.

Balth was born in Rotterdam.  His work is characterised by the innovative use of new media, where a synthesis of light, motion and space occupies a central position and where new means of perception are investigated. Balth uses a wide array of tools to get to the core of human perception and consistently utilises unconventional means and materials, from vinyl to Plexiglas to deliberately pixilated images. Balth has made many different kinds of works in his career, but his hallmark is exploring the intersections between abstract photography, painting and new media. Important influences in his work are Mondriaan and Lucio Fontana.

Museums 

His work can be found in, among others, the following museums:
 Stedelijk Museum, Amsterdam
 Kunstmuseum Den Haag, The Hague
 Museum of Modern Art, New York
 Centre Georges Pompidou, Paris
 Louisiana Museum of Modern Art, Humlebæk, Denmark
 National Gallery of Art, Washington
 Stedelijk Museum de Lakenhal, Leiden
 Kröller-Müller Museum, Otterlo
 Henry Art Gallery, Seattle
 Groninger Museum, Groningen 
 Stedelijk Museum Schiedam, Schiedam
 Museum Voorlinden, Wassenaar
 Princeton University Art Museum, Washington
 Fleming Museum of Art, Vermont
 Städtiches Museum Abteiberg, Monchengladbach
 Museo Fondazione Antonio & Carmela Calderara, Milan
 Musée d'Art Moderne et Contemporain, Saint-Étienne

Gallery

Selected exhibitions 
 2022 Double Je (collection Durand-Dessert) Musée d'art Moderne et Contemporain in Saint-Étienne 
 2020 Kjubh Kunstverein in Cologne: Beauty in Restraint
 2017 Parts Project 06 in The Hague
 2013 Louisiana Art & Science Museum in Baton Rouge: The Edge of Vision 
 2012 Schneider Museum of Art in Ashland: The Edge of Vision
 2011 The Henry Art Gallery in Seattle
 2010 Center for Creative Photography in Tucson: The Edge of Vision Abstract photography
 2009 Aperture Foundation in New York: The Edge of Vision 
 2009 China Pingyao Photography Festival in Pingyao
 2002 Kunstraum Innsbruck
 2001 Kunstmuseum The Hague: The Beauty of Intimacy
 2001 Staatliche Kunsthalle Baden Baden: The Beauty of Intimacy
 2000 Kunstmuseum The Hague
 1992 Elga Wimmer Gallery New York
 1989 Danforth Museum in Boston: Vision and Revision, recent art from the Netherlands
 1988 Städtisches Museum Abteiberg in Monchengladbach: Collectie Etzold
 1988 Kunsthalle Dusseldorf: Similia/Dissimilia
 1987 Columbia University New York: Similia/Dissimilia
 1987 Vereniging van het S.M.A.K in Ghent
 1986 Folkwang Museum in Essen
 1985 Groninger Museum
 1983 Museum hedendaagse Kunst Utrecht
 1981 Mercato del Sale in Milan
 1978 Palais des Beaux Arts in Brussels: Les Livres d'artistes 
 1977 Van Abbemuseum in Eindhoven
 1977 Musee d'Art et d'Industrie in St Etienne
 1975 Galerie Swart in Amsterdam
 1974 Folkwang Museum in Essen
 1974 Stedelijk Museum in Amsterdam
 1972 Galerie Swart in Amsterdam
 1972 La Polena in Genova
 1969 Galerie Swart in Amsterdam
 1969 Stedelijk Museum Schiedam

Groups of works 
 Light Objects 1969–1975
 Light Photo Works 1975–1978 
 The New Collages 1979–1982 
 Polaroid Paintings 1982–1986 
 Laser Paintings 1986–1995 
 Natsune Paper Works 1995–2000 
 The Vinyls 1997–1999 
 Videowatercolors 2000–2019

Media 
 Upchurch, Michael 'Videowatercolors' play with time and space	The Seattle Times 2011
 Brian Miller, The Henry's Two Big Fall Shows. Brain art vs. body art The Seattle Weekly 2011
 Heingartner, Douglas Videowatercolors: the Perception of Meaning 2007
 Brehm, Margrit Die Verwandlung von Potenzialität in Realität. Einige Gedanken zu den Videowatercolors von Carel Balth Heart Beat 2005
 Jansen, Gregor Die Errettung der äußeren Wirklichkeit. Medientheoretische Überlegungen zu den Videowatercolor Heart Beat 2005
 Mac Giolla Léith, Caoimhín Carel Balth's The New Collages and the psychodynamics of vision Heart Beat	2005
 Wieczorek, Marek From Magneple to Videowatercolors: The Heart Beat in Balth's Oeuvre Heart Beat	2005
 Van Hasselt, Kai / van Zeil, Wieteke “Dit is mijn meta-kunstwerk” Volkskrant 2005
 Bronwasser, Sacha Dicht op de huid van de kunstenaar Volkskrant 2001
 Piller, Micky Intensiteit en bravoure Het Financieële Dagblad 2001
 Put, Roos van Intimiteit van de gedachte Haagsche Courant 2001
 Smallenburg, Sandra De charme van ontluikende seksualiteit NRC Handelsblad 2001
 Stiemer, Flora De jaren negentig: vrijheid en betrokkenheid Algemeen Dagblad 2001
 Velde, Paola van de Intimiteit van de jaren negentig De Telegraaf 2001
 Wieczorek, Marek Sky Lines: recent work of Carel Balth 2001
 Roos, Renate Vogelflug im Bild Kölner Stadt-Anzeiger 1999
 Wieczorek, Marek Reflections: The World Writ Large with Carel Balth 1997
 Ooms, Toine The Interactive Exhibition; Tools and Tales, CD-Rom Catalogue Artis, ‘s-Hertogenbosch	1994
 Wieczorek, Marek The Touch of Light: Laser Paintings by Carel Balth 1993
 Ostrow, Saul "Shifting Ground, Unstable Territories" Sytsema Galleries, Baarn 1992
 Van Mulders, Wim "Permutations of Unveiled Realities" Kunst Nu 87-5 1987
 Norden, Linda Similia/Dissimilia:"Carel Balth" Similia/Dissimilia, pp. 69–73	1987
 Kouwenhoven, Frank "De schilderijen van Carel Balth, het vangen van licht" Cicero nr. 8. Leiden	1986
 Stachelhaus, Heiner Foto oder Malerei – das ist die Frage Neue Ruhr Zeitung, Essen	1986
 Van Mulders, Wim "Fictions of a Clear Conscience" Groninger Museum, Groningen. Museum Folkwang Essen Carel Balth: The Next Stage of Knowing pp. 7–24, 31- 53 1986
 Scheers-Simons, Marijke "Carel Balth" De Bouwadviseur, nr. 7/8 pp. 28–31 1985
 Balth, Carel "A way in painting? "Arte Factum, nr. 6, Antwerp, pp. 48-50 1984
 Daval, Jean-Luc	In: La Photographie, Histoire d'un Art. Albert Skira, Geneva, pp. 249 1982
 Caroli, Flavio Enciclopedia, il magico primario in Europa. Galleria Civica, Modena 1981
 Piller, Micky “The Light and Dark Side of Carel Balth’s Reality” Carel Balth: Towards a Monumental Lyricism. pp. 5–14	1980
 Art Actuel. Editions d’Art Albert Skira, Geneva Skira Annuel 5.	1979
 Debbaut, Jan / Liat, Kwee Swan / Wintgens, Doris / Balth, Carel
 Carel Balth, Light-Photoworks, Transitions and Diptychs. Van Abbemuseum, Eindhoven 1978
 Peters, Phillip “Tekenen met Licht”	Kunstbeeld. Amsterdam 1978
 Rotzler, Willy “Calculated Phantasy”. Rizzoli, Inc. New York Constructive Concepts, pp. 203 1977
 Balth, Carel Catalogue Museum Folkwang, Essen 1974
 Kerber, Bernhard “Carel Balth” Art International XVIII nr. 4, pp. 48–49 1974
 Daval, Jean-Luc In: La Photographie, Histoire d'un Art. Lugano Edition d'Art Albert Skira, Geneva, pp. 249 1974
 Stachelhaus, Heiner “Seeing and Understanding Light. Notes on the Work of Carel Balth” Carel Balth: The Art of Seeing pp. 1–20 1974
 Kerber, Bernhard “Works between painting and relief” Carel Balth: The Art of Seeing, pp. 20–25 1974
 Odenhausen, Helmut “Giochi di luce e di superfice”	Acciaio, Acier, Stahl, Steel, nr. 1	1970

References

External links 
 

1939 births
2019 deaths
Dutch painters
Dutch male painters
Painters from Rotterdam
Abstract art
Abstract artists
Conceptual artists
Dutch contemporary artists
Conceptual art
20th-century Dutch artists
21st-century Dutch artists
20th-century Dutch male artists